"The Potion" is the third single from Ludacris' fourth studio album, The Red Light District. It peaked at number 65 on the Hot R&B/Hip-Hop Songs singles chart. The beat was originally offered to Jay-Z for The Black Album, but was rejected in favor of the beat that was used in "Dirt Off Your Shoulder". This song was the conclusion to the music video of the preceding single "Number One Spot". The song was also featured in the final dance sequence of Step Up 2: The Streets.

Track listing
 "The Potion" (Clean version)
 "The Potion" (Main version)
 "The Potion" (Instrumental)
 "Pass Out" (Clean version)
 "Pass Out" (Main version)
 "Pass Out" (Instrumental)

Charts

References

2004 songs
2005 singles
Ludacris songs
Song recordings produced by Timbaland
Songs written by Ludacris
Songs written by Timbaland
Def Jam Recordings singles